Halebidu (IAST: Haḷēbīḍ, literally "old capital, city, encampment" or "ruined city") is a town located in Hassan District, Karnataka, India. Historically known as Dwarasamudra (also Dorasamudra), Halebidu became the regal capital of the Hoysala Empire in the 11th century CE. In the modern era literature it is sometimes referred to as Halebeedu or Halebid as the phonetic equivalent, a local name after it was damaged and deserted after being ransacked and looted twice by the forces of the Delhi Sultanate in the 14th century.

Halebidu is home to some of the best examples of Hindu and Jain temples with Hoysala architecture. These show the breadth of Hindu artwork traditions – Shiva, Vishnu, Devi and Vedic deities – fused into the same temple complex, depicted with a diversity of regional heritages, along with inscriptions in scripts from South and North India. The Hindu temples include Jaina reliefs in its panel. Similarly, the Jaina artwork includes the different Tirthankara as well as a Saraswati within its  mantapa. Most notable among the Halebidu monuments are the ornate Hoysalesvara temple, Kedareshwara temple, Jaina Basadi temples, as well as the Hulikere step well (kalyani). These sites are within a kilometer of each other. The Hoysaleshwara Temple remains the only surviving monument in Halebidu.

Location
Halebidu is connected by road and rail to Hassan (30 km), Mysore (150 km) and Mangalore (184 km). It is about 15 kilometers from Belur, another site known for its intricately carved Hoysala era temples.

History
Halebidu is in the midst of a valley east of the Western Ghats. It is surrounded by low-lying mountains, boulders and seasonal rivers. This valley is well connected to northern Karnataka, western Andhra Pradesh and northern Tamil Nadu. Around this region, between the 10th and 14th-century, the Hoysaḷa dynasty came to power, whose history is unclear. By their own 11th and 12th-century inscriptions, they were descendants of the Krishna-Baladeva-roots and the Yadavas of Maharashtra. They married into the Kalyana Chalukya Hindu dynasty, known for its temple and art tradition. The reliability of these inscriptions have been questioned as potential mythistory by some historians, who propose that the Hoysalas were a local Hindu family – a hill chief from the Western Ghats remembered for having killed a tiger or a lion, and they seized and over time expanded their power starting in the 10th-century.

Halebidu was built anew near a large reservoir by the early Hoysala kings, with support from their governors, merchants, and artisans. They greatly excavated and expanded the Dorasamudra reservoir. Major and spectacularly carved Hindu and Jain temples were already complete by the 12th-century. Around the city were fort walls, generally tracing a rounded square-like area with an average span of 2.25 kilometers. Inside were four major water reservoirs and many smaller public water tanks. The city life, it major temples and the roads were centered near the Dorasamudra water reservoir. The city several dozen temples, of which only a small set has survived. Three set of temples – Hoysaleswara (twin temple), Jain Basadi (three temples) and Kedareshvara (one temple) – were the largest, more sophisticated in their architecture and artwork, while the rest were simpler.

To the immediate west of the major Hindu and Jain temples was the Hoysala Palace. This palace stretched south up to the Benne Gudda (lit., butter hill). The palace is completely ruined and gone, with section lost in mounds and fragments found near the Benne Gudda. To the west of the palace was another group of Hindu and Jain temples – the Nagaresvara site, also destroyed whose ruins have been found in mounds. To the north of the original Hoysala city was a Saraswati temple and a Krishna temple, both also ruined and mostly lost. Towards the center and south of the old city were Hucesvara temple and a Rudresvara temple, evidenced by inscriptions and ruins that have been discovered. Four temples in northeastern section have survived – Gudlesvara, Virabhadra, Kumbalesvara and Ranganatha. The western part of the fortified section and beyond the fort were the historic farms that fed the population of the Dorasamudra capital. Roads connected the Hoysala capital to other major towns and pilgrimage sites such as Belur and Pushpagiri. Numerous inscriptions dating between mid 10th-century to early 13th-century attest to the importance of Dorasamudra to various Hoysala kings.

After the first invasion and destruction of Dorasamudra in the 14th-century, inscriptions suggest that there were attempts to repair the temples, palace and infrastructure in Dorasamudra. As a condition to an end to the invasion, Malik Kafur of Delhi Sultanate demanded king Ballala to accept suzerainty of Khalji, pay tribute and provide logistical support to the Sultanate forces seeking to raid and loot the fabled wealth in the Pandya capital of Madurai in Tamil Nadu. Additional waves of wars of destruction and loot from the Sultanates ended the Hoysala kingdom and Dorasamudra's prosperity as a capital city. For nearly 300 years, Dorasamudra saw no new inscriptions or evidence of political or economic prosperity. A mid 17th-century Nayaka era inscription in Belur thereafter becomes the first to mention "Halebidu". Meanwhile the surviving Hindu and Jain communities continued to support and repair the temples, with evidence of living temples in what is now the northern part of Halibidu.

Monuments
The major historic monuments in Halebid include:

Hoysaleswara Temple – the largest and most elaborate, a twin temple dedicated to Shiva with a major display of reliefs of Shaivism, Vaishnavism, Shaktism and Vedic legends.
Jain temples, Halebidu – three large temples in a row, close to Hoysaleswara, dedicated to Parshvanatha, Shantinatha and Adinatha of Jainism, major monolith Jina statues and intricately carved Saraswati
Kedareshwara Temple, Halebidu – a three sanctum temple dedicated to Shiva, also with a galaxy of reliefs of Shaivism, Vaishnavism, Shaktism and Vedic legends.
Northern group of historic Hindu and Jain temples – much simpler architecture and limited artwork, but living temples with ruins recovered by local community; these include the Gudlesvara, Virabhadra, Kumbalesvara and Ranganatha temples.
Nagaresvara and palace archaeological site – mounds and ruins; excavations of a few mounds have unearthed Hindu and Jain temple structures, idols and scattered parts
Hulikere step well – one of the most sophisticated 12th-century step well in south Karnataka, illustrates the public water infrastructure in erstwhile Hoysala capital
Museum – the park and near the Hoysaleswara temple

Nearby sites
Chennakeshava Temple, Belur – 16 km from Halebidu, Belur was the first capital of the Hoysalas. The Chennakeshava temple is the largest pre-14th century Karnata tradition Hindu temples complex that has survived into the modern age.
Ishvara Temple, Arasikere – a Vesara and Hoysala architecture Hindu temple for Shiva that illustrates the dome-style Hindu architecture for mandapa built about a hundred years before the first invasion of Delhi Sultanate and the start of Deccan version of the Indo-Islamic architecture. It is about 40 kilometers east-northeast of Halebidu.
The other major temple in the village called the Sadasiva Temple, Nuggehalli is a remarkable Hoysala synthesis of north Indian Nagara architecture with South Indian ideas on architecture.

Gallery

See also
 Shravanabelagola
 Somanathapura
 Doddagaddavalli
Javagal
Banavara

Notes

References

External links

Sacred Ensembles of the Hoysala – Belur and Halebid, UNESCO World Heritage Sites Pending Application Package
Hoysalesvara Temple, Halebid , Archaeological Survey of India, Bengaluru Circle
Parsvanatha Basadi, Halebid , Archaeological Survey of India, Bengaluru Circle
Kedaresvara Temple, Halebid , Archaeological Survey of India, Bengaluru Circle
Shantinatha Basadi, Halebid , Archaeological Survey of India, Bengaluru Circle
Step well, Hulikere Halebid , Archaeological Survey of India, Bengaluru Circle

Cities and towns in Hassan district
Archaeological sites in Karnataka
Former capital cities in India
12th-century Hindu temples
12th-century Jain temples
Colossal Jain statues in India